is a Japanese manga artist. Kodaka made her debut in 1989 in the magazine Weekly Shōnen Champion with Sessa Takuma!. She mainly writes manga in the Boys Love genre, featuring homosexual relationships between men for women, and has been described as "a pioneer and top-ranked artist" in the genre. She decided to enter the Boys Love genre as a result of reading parody manga with yaoi themes, finding them "more interesting" than regular shōjo manga and more psychologically complex than shōnen manga. She has also written many dojinshi which are famous, but difficult to obtain, from the series Prince of Tennis, Fullmetal Alchemist, Hikaru no Go, Gankutsuou: The Count of Monte Cristo and Slam Dunk. She designed the characters for the My Sexual Harassment OVA. She taught herself how to draw, but one of her design influences is Rumiko Takahashi. She draws by hand, not using computers, and learned shōjo manga techniques from Sanami Matoh, author of Fake.

Works

Ikumen After
Border
Ren ai Hōteishiki
Kizuna: Bonds of Love
Hana to Ryū
Sessa Takuma!
Kimera
Kusatta Kyōshi no Hōteishiki
Sebiro no Housekeeper
Boku No Sexual Harassment
Sex Therapist
Mezase Hero!
Not Ready?! Sensei
Midare Somenishi
Ihōjin Etranger
Chocomint

References

Further reading

External links
Official site (Japanese)
B-Boy's profile of Kazuma Kodaka (Japanese)

1969 births
Living people
Japanese female comics artists
Women manga artists
Manga artists from Hyōgo Prefecture